Erigeron pacayensis is a Central American species of flowering plant in the family Asteraceae. It has been found only in Guatemala, El Salvador, and Honduras.

Erigeron pacayensis is  a perennial subshrub with a woody stem up to 55 cm (22 inches) tall, producing a woody taproot. Leaves are very narrow, almost thread-like, though with a few teeth along the edges. The plant produces flower heads on long, thin stalks. Each head contains 50-120 white ray florets surrounding numerous yellow disc florets.

References

External links

Photo of herbarium specimen in Missouri Botanical Garden, collected in Guatemala in 2007

pacayensis
Flora of Guatemala
Flora of Honduras
Flora of El Salvador
Plants described in 1907